The following lists events that happened during 1919 in South Africa.

Incumbents
 Monarch: King George V.
 Governor-General and High Commissioner for Southern Africa: The Viscount Buxton.
 Prime Minister:
 Louis Botha (until 27 August).
 Jan Smuts (from 3 September).
 Chief Justice: James Rose Innes

Events
April
 23 – The Potchefstroom Teachers' College opens.

August
 27 – Prime Minister Louis Botha dies in office.

September
 3 – Jan Smuts becomes the 2nd Prime Minister of South Africa.
 17 – German South West Africa is placed under South African administration.

November
 7 – Inspired by Cape Town's daily Noon Gun Three Minute Pause, King George V institutes the Two Minute Silence following a suggestion by Sir Percy Fitzpatrick, to be observed annually at the Eleventh Hour of the Eleventh Day of the Eleventh Month.
 7 – The first Remembrance Day is observed in the British Empire with a two-minute silence at 11:00 hours.

Births
 1 January – Eustace Fannin, tennis player 
 3 March – Peter Abrahams, South African-born Jamaican novelist and journalist. (d. 2017)
 8 December – Mary Benson, activist and author. (d. 2000)

Deaths
 19 March – Jack Hindon, Boer soldier. (b. 1874)
 27 August – Louis Botha, Boer general, statesman, first Prime Minister. (b. 1862)

Railways

Railway lines opened
 9 January – Natal – Deviation from Umlaas Road to Pentrich, .

Locomotives
Two new Cape gauge and one narrow gauge locomotive types enter service on the South African Railways (SAR):
 The first of sixty-seven  4-8-2 Mountain type locomotives.
 The first ten Class 16C 4-6-2 Pacific type passenger steam locomotives.
 Three Class NG G11 2-6-0+0-6-2 Garratt articulated steam locomotives on the Avontuur narrow gauge line through the Langkloof, the first Garratt locomotives to enter service in South Africa.

References

South Africa
Years in South Africa
History of South Africa